Antipolo's at-large congressional district was the lone congressional district of the Philippines in the city of Antipolo for the House of Representatives between 1998 and 2004. It was created after the passage of Republic Act No. 8508 in 1998 which converted Antipolo into a component city of Rizal following the 1995 census. The district was represented by Victor Sumulong for the entirety of its existence. He was redistricted into Antipolo's 2nd congressional district after the passage of Republic Act No. 9232 which abolished the district and reapportioned Antipolo into two congressional districts following the 2000 census.

Representation history

See also
Legislative districts of Antipolo

References

Former congressional districts of the Philippines
Politics of Antipolo
1998 establishments in the Philippines
2003 disestablishments in the Philippines
At-large congressional districts of the Philippines
Congressional districts of Calabarzon
Constituencies established in 1998
Constituencies disestablished in 2003